Millbrook is an unincorporated community in Wayne County, in the U.S. state of Ohio.

History
Millbrook was platted in 1829. A post office called Mill Brook was established in 1829, and remained in operation until 1902.

References

Unincorporated communities in Wayne County, Ohio
Unincorporated communities in Ohio